Charlie Bradshaw may refer to:

 Charlie Bradshaw (offensive tackle) (1936–2002), American football offensive tackle
 Charlie Bradshaw (American football coach) (1923–1999), American football coach at the University of Kentucky and Troy University
 Charles Bradshaw (born 1805), Victorian merchant and politician